The South African Institute of Town and Regional Planners was formed in 1954, a successor to the South African Branch of the Royal Town Planning Institute.  Its primary objective was “to advance the science and art of town and regional planning” The institute was concerned mostly with the promotion of, and standards within, the profession and the discipline.

For approximately 40 years the SAITRP was the only professional association of national significance in South Africa.  Its position of prominence began to crumble in the 1990s, and this decline coincided with the anti-apartheid revolution in that country.  The institute was perceived by some to harbour apartheid prejudice.  The Development Planning Association of South Africa (DPASA) was founded in January 1994 by younger planners who criticised the lack of action on the part of the SAITRP in promoting transformation of both South African society.

In 1996 both the South African Institute of Town and Regional Planners and Development Planning Association gave way to the South African Planning Institute.  This new institute incorporated within its objectives that showed clear support for the values of post-apartheid South Africa, and the SAITRP was dissolved.

References

Professional planning institutes
Professional associations based in South Africa
Research institutes in South Africa